On 6 March 2023, a series of landslides were triggered by continuous rain in Serasan Island of Serasan District, Natuna Regency, Riau Islands, Indonesia. Around 50 people were killed and four others are still missing while contact to the Serasan Island was entirely lost. An entire village was reportedly buried.

Aftermath 
Riau Islands provincial government dispatched 25 police personnel to the island for initial relief efforts. Regional Disaster Mitigation Agency of Natuna Regency and 318th Natuna Military District also dispatched two ships. The relief effort is hampered due to the heavy rains which forced the search efforts to halt on several occasions as well as the islands' remote location which takes 5 hours using a boat normally during calm weather from the capital of the regency, Ranai. A search and rescue team was dispatched from Ranai with a total of 36 people. The landslides resulted in total blackout of electricity and telecommunication connection to the island, making contact with the outside world difficult. The landslides also damaged major roads across the island.

See also

 Weather in 2023
 Climate of Indonesia

References 

Landslides in 2023
2023 disasters in Indonesia
Landslides in Indonesia
March 2023 events in Indonesia
Natuna Regency